Ataman is a Turkish surname. Notable people with the surname include:
 Bülent Ataman (born 1974), Turkish footballer
 Ergin Ataman (born 1966), Turkish basketball coach
 Kutluğ Ataman (born 1961), Turkish filmmaker

Turkish-language surnames
de:Ataman (Name)